Lézignan-Corbières is a commune in the Aude department in the Occitanie region in southern France.  Situated in the Corbières wine region not far from Narbonne, it has a Vine and Wine Museum (Musée de la Vigne et du Vin).

Geography
The river Orbieu flows northeast through the southeastern part of the commune and forms part of its eastern border. Lézignan-Corbières station has rail connections to Toulouse, Carcassonne and Narbonne.

Population

Sport
Football Club de Lézignan (also known as Lézignan Sangliers - the Wild Boars) are a semi-professional rugby league club based in Lézignan-Corbières. They became French Champions for the first time in 30 years at the end of the 2007-2008 national competition.

Lezignan 9s is a rugby league nines tournament.

A FlyZone Indoor Skydiving Windtunnel has opened in November 2011 http://www.flyzone.fr/

Education
Schools include:

Public preschools (école maternelle):
 Ecole Maternelle Alphonse Daudet
 Ecole Escouto Can Plaou
 Ecole Maternelle Françoise Dolto

Public primary schools (école primaire):
 Ecole Frédéric Mistral (from CP to CE1)
 Ecole Marie-Curie (from CE2 to CM2)

Public junior high schools (collège):
 Collège Joseph Anglade
 Collège Rosa Parks

There is one public senior high school/sixth form college, Lycée Ernest Ferroul.

Private schools:
 L'Institut l'Amandier (collège-lycée)
 Ecole Privée Sainte Thérèse (maternelle-primaire)

See also
 Corbières AOC
 Communes of the Aude department

References

External links
 Lézignan-Corbières

Communes of Aude
Aude communes articles needing translation from French Wikipedia